This is a list of music-related events in 1816.

Events
January 9 – Ludwig van Beethoven obtains custody of his nephew Karl, after a legal battle with the boy's mother.
January 12 – The première of Gioacchino Rossini's new cantata, Giunone, takes place at the Teatro di San Carlo, Naples, where the composer is musical director.
February 12 – The Teatro di San Carlo in Naples burns down; reconstruction starts almost immediately, at the behest of King Ferdinand IV.
February 20 – Rossini's opera, Almaviva, ossia L’inutile precauzione (later better known as The Barber of Seville), receives its première at the Teatro Argentina, Rome.
March 21 – Prominent Jewish couple Abraham and Lea Mendelssohn arrange for their four children, Fanny, Felix, Rebecka and Paul, to be secretly baptized as Lutherans in the Jerusalemkirche, Berlin.
April 9 – Returning to Prague after a twenty-year absence, Johann Nepomuk Hummel gives a public recital.
April 17 – Josef von Spaun writes to Johann Wolfgang von Goethe for permission to have his poems set to music by the youthful Franz Schubert.
April 29 – Luigi Cherubini's cantata Inno alla primavera, commissioned by the Royal Philharmonic Society, is given its première in London, a year later than scheduled and without the composer present.
June 16 – In recognition of the 50th anniversary of his arrival in Vienna, Antonio Salieri is presented with a gold medal by the Lord Chamberlain on behalf of the Emperor Francis II.
July 13 – Carl Maria von Weber meets Count Vitzthum von Eckstädt at Carlsbad; the encounter leads to Weber being appointed Kapellmeister at Dresden.
October 2 – Johann Nepomuk Hummel is offered a post at Stuttgart by Duke Frederick I of Württemberg.
October 18 – Louis Spohr and Niccolò Paganini meet in Venice.
November 19 – Carl Maria von Weber becomes engaged to soprano Caroline Brandt.  
November 25 – Muzio Clementi leaves London after a six-month stay.

Classical music
Ludwig van Beethoven 
An die ferne Geliebte, Op. 98
Der Mann von Wort, Op. 99
Piano Sonata No. 28
Sehnsucht, WoO 146
Luigi Cherubini – Requiem in C minor
Johann Nepomuk Hummel – Septet No.1, Op. 74
Conradin Kreutzer – String Quintet, Op. 62
Franz Krommer – 3 String Quartets, Op. 92
Joseph Mayseder – Polonaise No.3, Op. 12
Giacomo Meyerbeer – Gli amori di Teolinda (cantata)
Ignaz Moscheles – Grande sonate, Op. 41
George Onslow – 3 String Quartets, Op. 9
Franz Schubert
Litanei auf das Fest Aller Seelen, D. 343
Stabat Mater in F minor
Overture in B-flat major, D.470
String Trio in B-flat major, D 471
Lieder: Stimme der Liebe, D.412; 3 Gesänge des Harfners, Op. 12, D.478; Der Wanderer, D.489; Loda's Gespenst, D.150; Die Erwartung, D.159
Jan Václav Voříšek – 6 Impromptus, Op. 7
Carl Maria von Weber – Divertimento assai facile, Op. 38

Opera
François Adrien Boieldieu
La fête du village voisin
Charles de France (with Ferdinand Hérold)
Michele Carafa – Gabriella di Vergy
Gaetano Donizetti – Il Pigmalione
Étienne Méhul – La journée aux aventures
Gioachino Rossini 
Il Barbiere di Siviglia 
Otello
Franz Schubert – Die Bürgschaft, D.435 (unfinished)
Carlo Soliva – La Testa di Bronzo
Louis Spohr – Faust

Births
February 26 – Franz Krenn, composer and music teacher (d. 1897)
March 19 – Johannes Verhulst, conductor and composer (d. 1891)
April 13 – William Sterndale Bennett, pianist and composer (d. 1875)
April 26 – Eugène Albert, woodwind instrument maker (d. 1890)
July 16 – Antoine François Marmontel, French pianist (died 1898)
August 17 – Benjamin Bilse, conductor and composer (d. 1902)
September 4 – François Bazin, opera composer (d. 1878)
November 17 –  August Wilhelm Ambros, composer and music historian (d. 1876)
November 24 – Matteo Salvi, composer (d. 1887)
December 8 – Edvard Helsted, composer (d. 1900)
date unknown – Edward Edwards, musician and composer (d. 1897)

Deaths
February 10 – Jean Paul Egide Martini, composer (born 1741)
February 19 – Margareta Alströmer, singer and artist (born 1763)
March 16 – Giuseppe Jannaconi, composer (born 1740)
March 23 – Ignaz Vitzthumb, conductor and composer (born 1724)
May 4 – Marie-Madeleine Guimard, ballerina (born 1743)
May 25 – Samuel Webbe, composer (born 1740)
June 5 – Giovanni Paisiello, composer (born 1740)
July 31 – Josef Fiala, musician and composer (born 1748)
December 15 – Prince Joseph Franz Maximilian Lobkowitz, patron of Beethoven (born 1772)
date unknown – João José Baldi, pianist and composer (born 1770)

References

 
19th century in music
Music by year